North Carolina held its elections August 10, 1815.

See also 
 United States House of Representatives elections, 1814 and 1815
 List of United States representatives from North Carolina

Notes 

1815
North Carolina
United States House of Representatives